Coelenteramide is the oxidized product, or oxyluciferin, of the bioluminescent reactions in many marine organisms that use coelenterazine. It was first isolated as a blue fluorescent protein from Aequorea victoria after the animals were stimulated to emit light. Under basic conditions, the compound will break down further into coelenteramine and 4-hydroxyphenylacetic acid.

It is an aminopyrazine.

References

External links

Bioluminescence
Aminopyrazines
Carboxamides